St Helen's Church is a Grade II* listed parish church in the Church of England in Thorney, Nottinghamshire.

History

The church was built in 1850 by Lewis Nockalls Cottingham.

It is part of a group of parishes which includes
St Bartholomew's Church, Langford
St Giles' Church, Holme
St Cecilia's Church, Girton
All Saints' Church, Harby
St George the Martyr's Church, North & South Clifton
All Saints' Church, Collingham
St John the Baptist's Church, Collingham
St Helena's Church, South Scarle
Holy Trinity Church, Besthorpe
All Saints' Church, Winthorpe

References

Church of England church buildings in Nottinghamshire
Grade II* listed churches in Nottinghamshire
Newark and Sherwood